Aniekpeno Christopher Udo (born 11 November 1996)  is a Nigerian footballer who plays as a forward for Saudi club Al-Jandal.

Career
Udo transferred to Norwegian Eliteserien club Viking from Akwa United in January 2016. He signed a four-year contract with the club. On 20 February 2017, Udo completed a loan move to Norwegian First Division side Levanger. 

On 17 January 2022, Udo joined Saudi Arabian First Division League side Al-Kholood. On 26 August 2022, Udo joined Al-Jandal.

Career statistics

References

1996 births
Living people
Nigerian footballers
Viking FK players
Levanger FK players
Ljungskile SK players
Kuopion Palloseura players
Al-Kholood Club players
Al Jandal Club players
Eliteserien players
Norwegian First Division players
Ettan Fotboll players
Veikkausliiga players
Saudi First Division League players
Saudi Second Division players
Nigerian expatriate footballers
Expatriate footballers in Norway
Nigerian expatriate sportspeople in Norway
Expatriate footballers in Sweden
Nigerian expatriate sportspeople in Sweden
Expatriate footballers in Finland
Nigerian expatriate sportspeople in Finland
Expatriate footballers in Saudi Arabia
Nigerian expatriate sportspeople in Saudi Arabia
Association football forwards